Govindasamy Suppiah (born 17 June 1929 – 6 December 2012) was a Indian orgin Singaporean  football referee.

Suppiah officiated at the 1974 FIFA World Cup where he took charge of one match, Poland's 7–0 win against Haiti and went on to officiate as a linesman for two further matches.

He was the first Asian to referee a match at the FIFA World Cup.

Personal life
Suppiah was born in India, and died, aged 83, in Singapore.  He had two grandchildren, daughter named Shamini Suppiah, son named Subra Suppiah  and wife called Vallambal. Suppiah was a diabetic and had two toes removed from his foot after infection.

Awards
He was awarded by FIFA for being a referee instructor for 25 years. In 2009, he was presented with Distinguished Service Award and a Gold Service Award and in September, 2012 he was awarded the Lifetime Achievement Award.

References

External links
 
 Govindasamy Suppiah referee profile at Playmaker

Indian emigrants to Singapore
Singaporean people of Tamil descent
Singaporean sportspeople of Indian descent
Singaporean football referees 
FIFA World Cup referees
1974 FIFA World Cup referees
1929 births
2012 deaths